Ole Marius Sandberg (born 26 October 1975) is a Norwegian jazz bassist  who has collaborated with Erlend Skomsvoll, Odd Børretzen, Jan Eggum, Herborg Kråkevik, Christina Bjordal, and Nathalie Nordnes.

Career 
Sandberg started his formal musical education on the Music program at «Mosjøen vgs.» (1992–95), attended the Jazz program at «Sund Folkehøgskole» (1995–96), holds a bachler from the Jazz program at Trondheim Musikkonservatorium (1996–1999), and holds a music education degree from Griegakademiet in Bergen (2006–2008). From the time of his studies he joined bands like «Skomsork», «Mandala» and «First Edition» where he collaborated with musicians like Jan Gunnar Hoff and Erlend Skomsvoll.

In recent years, he has been active on both jazz venues and as a freelance musician at both theater on Den Nationale Scene in Bergen, and with artists like Odd Børretzen, Jan Eggum, Herborg Kråkevik, Nathalie Nordnes, Christina Bjordal, Christine Sandtorv, and Helene Bøksle.

Discography 
With Christina Bjordal
2006: Brighter Days (Universal)
2009: Warrior of Light (Universal)

Within Olav Kallhovd Trio
2005: Into the dream (Acoustic Records)

Within Mandala
2002: Mandala (Acoustic Records)

With Erlend Skomsvoll
2006: Variasjoner (Grappa)

Within Skomsork
2004: Skomsork (Park Grammofon)

With others
2001: Ein løvetann (Gilead), with Sølvi Helen Hopeland
2003: Men du syng Irina (Cantando), within Griegakademiets kammerkor
2005: Jordbærhagen (Lynor, 2005), with Ingelinn & Hildegunn Reigstad
2008: Forståelsen (Privat label), with Otto Henning Kjelstrup
2009: Det hev ei rose sprunge (Kulturservice/Universal Music), with Helene Bøksle
2009: Stjerneteller (Ifemmera), with Christine Sandtorv
2009: Rainbows over river hill  (Oslove), within The Rivermen
2011: Bohem (Kirkelig Kulturverksted), within Qvales Ensemble
2011: Angen av jord (Angen), with Dagfinn Iversen

References

External links 

1975 births
Living people
Grieg Academy alumni
Norwegian University of Science and Technology alumni
Norwegian jazz composers
Jazz double-bassists
Norwegian jazz upright-bassists
Male double-bassists
Musicians from Bodø
21st-century double-bassists
21st-century Norwegian male musicians